Titanomagnetite is a mineral containing oxides of titanium and iron, with the formula Fe2+(Fe3+,Ti)2O4. It is also known as titaniferous magnetite, mogensenite, Ti-magnetite, or titanian magnetite. It is part of the spinel group of minerals. The Curie temperature for titanomagnetite has been found to have a wide range of 200 to 580°C.

It is can be found in association with zircon, fluorapatite, ferro-ferri-katophrite, ulvöspinel, nepheline, chalcopyrite, phyrrotite, pyrite, natrolite, and chevkinite-(Ce).

References

Minerals
Spinel group